Walk It Out may refer to:

Songs 
 "Walk It Out" (Unk song), 2006
 "Walk It Out" (Jennifer Hudson song), 2014